Walter Behrendt (18 September 1914 in Dortmund – 23 July 1997 in Dortmund) was a German politician of the Social Democratic Party (SPD) and president of the European parliament (1971–1973).

Behrendt was trained as a merchant and accountant. He took part in World War II and afterwards worked as clerk in an industrial firm. In 1954 he became a contributor to the company journal of Hoesch-Westfalenhütte AG in Dortmund. Behrendt joined SPD in 1932 being a member of the Socialist Working Youth (Sozialistische Arbeiterjugend). From 1945 to 1947 he was chairman of the regional Socialist Youth for Dortmund, Lünen and Castrop-Rauxel. He was chairman of the SPD branch in Dortmund-Altenderne in 1951/52 and in Dortmund from 1952 to 1955.

From 1952 until his death Behrendt was municipal councillor in Dortmund. In 1957 he was elected member of the Bundestag (electoral constituency: Dortmund III) and remained in office until 1976. Between 1961 and 1967 he was assistant chairman of the Labour Committee. Additionally, Behrendt was member of the European Parliament from 1967 to 1977 where he served as vice-president (1969–71, 1973–77) and president (1971–73). He was one of the signers of the Humanist Manifesto in 1973.

Behrendt was also member of the supervisory board of Dortmunder Stadtwerke AG and Dortmunder Hafen und Eisenbahn AG.

References

1914 births
1997 deaths
Politicians from Dortmund
Presidents of the European Parliament
Social Democratic Party of Germany MEPs
MEPs for Germany 1958–1979
Knights Commander of the Order of Merit of the Federal Republic of Germany
Members of the Bundestag for North Rhine-Westphalia
Members of the Bundestag for the Social Democratic Party of Germany